Pteroteinon laufella, the blue red-eye, is a butterfly in the family Hesperiidae. It is found in north-eastern Guinea, Sierra Leone, Liberia, Ivory Coast, Ghana, Togo, Nigeria, Cameroon, Gabon, the Republic of the Congo, northern Angola and the central part of the Democratic Republic of the Congo. The habitat consists of forests.

Adults may spend the night inside the blossoms of Ipomoea species. Adult males occasionally mud-puddle.

The larvae feed on Elaeis guineensis and Cocos nucifera.

References

Butterflies described in 1868
Erionotini
Butterflies of Africa
Taxa named by William Chapman Hewitson